Dorothy Martin Simon (1919–2016) was an American physical chemist known for her work with aerospace combustion and development of polymers. She made important contributions while at NACA regarding heat shield construction and improvement of rocket engine designs. Her work with DuPont resulted in the creation of synthetic polymers Dacron and Orlon.

Early life and education 
Dorothy Martin was born on 18 September 1919 in Bacon Township, Vernon County, Missouri to Laudell M (née Flynn) (1892–1978) and Robert W. Martin.

She received her AB degree from Southwest Missouri State University where her father was head of the science department. There, she was the first graduate to achieve a perfect score (4.0 GPA). From there, she attended the University of Chicago for one year, before transferring to University of Illinois to become an assistant to a professor. She earned her PhD in physical chemistry in 1945 from the University of Illinois, with thesis work regarding radon. She married Sidney Simon, a fellow graduate student from the University of Chicago, in 1946 and took his surname.

Scientific career 
After earning her PhD, Simon was offered a position at DuPont’s Pioneer Research Lab in Buffalo, New York. Here, she worked to develop new catalysts to change the properties of synthetic polymers. This work led to the development of two polymers which would later be named Dacron and Orlon.

After completing her work with DuPont, Simon transferred to Oak Ridge National Laboratory, in Oak Ridge, Tennessee. Here, she made discoveries in the field of radiochemistry in studying the triple-fission of uranium. While at ORNL, Simon also became the first to discover a new isotope of calcium. For a short period of time after leaving ORNL, she continued with similar research regarding uranium at Argonne National Laboratory in Chicago, Illinois.

In 1949, Simon began work at Lewis Research Center in Cleveland, Ohio, a division of the National Advisory Committee for Aeronautics (NACA), the predecessor of NASA. Once here, she was assigned to the fuels and combustion division, where she conducted research regarding flame velocities and types of fuel for aerospace applications. She also conducted studies to determine the minimum diameter of tubing necessary to maintain an engine flame. This led to Simon being credited in numerous technical publications and research papers for her work, and led to improvements in engine designs for aeronautic and spaceflight purposes.

As a result of her work at NACA, Simon was given the Rockefeller Federal Service Award, which entailed a $10,000 (~$110,000 in 2022) grant from the Rockefeller Foundation. She used this award to travel to Europe to further her education at the University of Cambridge in Cambridge, England. Simon also toured around Europe where she met with scientists from Germany, England, France, and Italy to examine their research regarding physical chemistry and radiochemistry. Upon returning from her tour, she was promoted to assistant chief of NACA’s combustion branch, where she became a pioneer in female corporate management. Throughout the 1950’s she served as an advocate for women in science and education, appearing in several radio shows and magazines.

Once leaving NACA, Simon briefly held a position at Magnolia Petroleum in Texas, where she did work regarding oil sands.

In 1956, Simon took a position at AVCO corporation, an aviation conglomerate in New England. There, she applied her previous experience with polymer construction and physical chemistry to develop the technology for early aerospace heat shields, which were critical to NASA’s crewed spacecraft endeavors. This technology would go on to be used most notably during NASA’s Apollo program, and later was applied to ballistic missiles at the height of the Cold War. Simon remained at AVCO for 30 years, during which she held the titles of vice president and director of research at the company, becoming the company’s first female corporate officer.

Awards 

 Rockefeller Public Service Award (1953)
 Society of Women Engineers Achievement Award (1966)
 Businessweek’s list of 100 Top Corporate Women (1976)

Later life and death 
Simon retired from AVCO at the age of 65, moving to Pittsboro, North Carolina. She would operate her own consulting firm, Simon Associates, from her home until 1993. After concluding her research career, she served on numerous committees and advisory boards for government agencies, universities, and corporations. The most notable positions include the Department of Commerce Committee for the National Bureau of Standards, and the committee for the National Medal of Science during the Carter administration. Simon served as the first female trustee at Worcester Polytechnic Institute, where she set up the Dorothy M. Simon Endowed Fund for Fire Safety Studies.

Simon died on March 25, 2016 at the age of 96, in her home in Pittsboro, North Carolina.

References 

1919 births
2016 deaths
20th-century American women scientists
20th-century American chemists
American women chemists
American physical chemists
DuPont people
University of Chicago alumni
Missouri State University alumni
University of Illinois Urbana-Champaign alumni
Scientists from Missouri
People from Springfield, Missouri
National Advisory Committee for Aeronautics
Physical chemists
People from Missouri
People from Vernon County, Missouri